The Central Delaware Valley AVA is an American Viticultural Area located in southeastern Pennsylvania and New Jersey.  The wine appellation includes  surrounding the Delaware River north of Philadelphia.  Its southern boundary is near Titusville, New Jersey, just north of Trenton, and its northern border is near Musconetcong Mountain.  A variety of Vitis vinifera and Vitis labrusca grape varieties can be grown in the area. It has a hot-summer humid continental climate (Dfa) and is in hardiness zones 6b and 7a.

Boundary
The Central Delaware Valley viticultural area is located along the Delaware River in Hunterdon County and Mercer County in New Jersey, and Bucks County in Pennsylvania. The Federal Register describes the boundaries of the Central Delaware Valley AVA as having the following boundaries:

(1) The starting point of the following boundary description is the summit of Strawberry Hill, which is located in New Jersey near the Delaware River about one mile northwest of Titusville. (2) From the summit of Strawberry Hill in a straight line to the summit of Mt. Canoe. (3) From there due east to Mercer County Route 579 (Bear Tavern Road) about .2 mile south of Ackors Corner. (4) Then northward along Mercer 579 to Harbourton. (5) From there northwestward along Route 3 (Mount Airy-Harbourton Road) to the 2nd English Presbyterian Church in Mount Airy. (6) From there along Old York Road northward to U.S. Route 202. (7) From there westward along Queen Road and northwestward along Mount Airy Road to Dilts Corner. (8) From there northwestward along Dilts Corner Road to Sandy Ridge Church. (9) From there northwestward via Cemetery Road to Covered Bridge Road. (9) From there northward along Covered Bridge Road to Green Sergeant Covered Bridge. (10) From there generally westward along Sanford Road to its intersection with Route 519 about one mile north of Rosemont. (11) From there northward along Route 519 to Palmyra. (12) From the intersection in Palmyra, in a straight line northward to the 487 ft. elevation point near Nishisakawick Creek. (13) From there in a straight line northwestward to Benchmark 787 on Rt. 579 (a secondary hard surface highway, unnamed on the map). (14) From there northward along Route 579. (15) From there in a straight line westward to the 952 ft. summit of Musconetcong Mountain. (16) From there in a straight line southwestward to the 836 ft. summit of Musconetcong Mountain. (17) From there in straight lines connecting the 838 ft., 839 ft., 707 ft., and 386 ft. summits of Musconetcong Mountain. (18) From the 386 ft. summit of Musconetcong Mountain in a straight line across the Delaware River to the intersection of Routes 611 and 212. (19) From there along Route 212 to the intersection with the lane going up Mine Hill. (20) From there in a straight line to the summit of Mine Hill. (20) From there in a straight line southwestward to the 522 ft. summit elevation point. (21) From there southeastward to the summit of Chestnut Hill. (22) From there in a straight line southeastward to the 347 ft. summit elevation point (located south of Kintnersville, about .1 mile west of Route 611). (23) From there in a straight line eastward to the summit of Coffman Hill. (24) From there in a straight line southeastward to the 628 ft. summit elevation point (about .3 mile north of Camp Davis). (25) From there in a straight line southeastward to the point where Bridgeton, Nockamixon, and Tinicum Townships meet. From there in a straight line southward to the intersection of Slant Hill Road (Covered Bridge Road) and Stump Road in Smiths Corner. (26) From there in a straight line southeastward to the 472 ft. elevation point near Rocky Ridge School. (27) From there southeastward in a straight line to the 522 ft. elevation point on Plumstead Hill. (28) From there in a straight line to the 482 ft. elevation point about .7 mile northwest of Lahaska. (29) From there in a straight line southeastward to the 352 ft. elevation point approximately .6 mile northeast of Lahaska. (30) From there in a straight line to the point where a power transmission line crosses the 400 ft. contour line on the south side of Solebury Mountain. (31) From there in a straight line to the tower on Bowman Hill in Washington Crossing State Park. (32) From there in a straight line across the Delaware River to the starting point, the summit of Strawberry Hill.

Wineries
, there are three wineries in the Central Delaware Valley AVA which all reside in Pennsylvania.

 Crossing Vineyards & Winery in Washington Crossing
 New Hope Winery in New Hope
 Sand Castle Winery in Erwinna

There are currently no New Jersey wineries established in the Central Delaware Valley AVA.

See also 
Alcohol laws of New Jersey
Cape May Peninsula AVA
Garden State Wine Growers Association
Judgment of Princeton
List of wineries, breweries, and distilleries in New Jersey
New Jersey Farm Winery Act
New Jersey wine
New Jersey Wine Industry Advisory Council
Outer Coastal Plain AVA
Warren Hills AVA

References

American Viticultural Areas
Delaware River
New Jersey wine
Pennsylvania wine
1984 establishments in New Jersey
1984 establishments in Pennsylvania